Dean Anthony Woods OAM (22 June 1966 – 3 March 2022) was an Australian racing cyclist from Wangaratta in Victoria known for his track cycling at the Olympic Games and Commonwealth Games. On Australia Day 1985 he was awarded the Order of Australia medal for service to cycling. He was an Australian Institute of Sport scholarship holder.

Career
At the 1984 Summer Olympics in Los Angeles, Woods, with teammates Michael Grenda, Kevin Nichols and Michael Turtur, won the 4000m team pursuit. Critics did not give them much chance. The team was coached by Charlie Walsh and dubbed "Charlie's Angels". In the final the Australians defeated the United States by 3.86 seconds, even though the Australians were riding conventional bikes while the Americans had high-tech machines. Woods told The Border Mail in 2004, "Expectations weren't high for us from the press, but we thought we would do pretty well. We had a close team."

In the 4000m individual pursuit Woods was beaten for bronze by Leonard Nitz (US).

At the 1988 Summer Olympics in Seoul, Wayne McCarney, Stephen McGlede, Scott McGrory, Brett Dutton and Woods won the bronze medal for the team pursuit, defeated by the USSR (gold) and German Democratic Republic (silver). In the individual pursuit Woods won the silver medal.

Woods won a bronze medal in the team pursuit at the 1996 Summer Olympics. At the 1986 Commonwealth Games he won the individual pursuit event. At the 1990 Melbourne to Warrnambool Classic, Woods set the record of 5h 12m or 50.9 km/h for this 265 km race.

Woods established and worked at a bicycle shop, Dean Woods Direct, in Wangaratta but later sold it.

He died from cancer on 3 March 2022, at the age of 55.

Major results
Sources:
1989
 5th Grand Prix Eddy Merckx
 8th Overall Tour de Picardie
1990
 7th Grand Prix Eddy Merckx
 9th Benego Omloop
 10th Overall Vuelta a Aragón
1991
 4th Overall Tour of Sweden
1st Stage 1a (ITT)
1993
 1st Stage 2 Herald Sun Tour

Grand Tour general classification results timeline

References

1966 births
2022 deaths
Australian Institute of Sport cyclists
Australian male cyclists
Australian track cyclists
Olympic cyclists of Australia
Cyclists at the 1984 Summer Olympics
Cyclists at the 1988 Summer Olympics
Cyclists at the 1996 Summer Olympics
Cyclists at the 1986 Commonwealth Games
Cyclists at the 1994 Commonwealth Games
People from Wangaratta
Cyclists from Victoria (Australia)
Olympic medalists in cycling
Recipients of the Medal of the Order of Australia
Olympic gold medalists for Australia
Olympic silver medalists for Australia
Olympic bronze medalists for Australia
Medalists at the 1984 Summer Olympics
Medalists at the 1988 Summer Olympics
Medalists at the 1996 Summer Olympics
Commonwealth Games medallists in cycling
Commonwealth Games gold medallists for Australia
Commonwealth Games silver medallists for Australia
Commonwealth Games bronze medallists for Australia
Sport Australia Hall of Fame inductees
Medallists at the 1986 Commonwealth Games
Medallists at the 1994 Commonwealth Games